Guadalupe Victoria Municipality is a municipality in the Mexican state of Puebla. According to the National Statistics Institute (INEGI), it had a population of 15,041 inhabitants in the 2005 census. Its total area is 239.83 km². It is named after Guadalupe Victoria, the first president of Mexico.

Its geographical coordinates are 19° 17′ North, and  97° 20′ West. Its highest elevation is the rhyolitic twin dome volcano Las Derrumbadas (3480 m).

External links
 https://web.archive.org/web/20070324000550/http://www.e-local.gob.mx/work/templates/enciclo/puebla/Mpios/21067a.htm

Municipalities of Puebla